Nightingale is a ballet created in 1939 by Aleksey Yermolayev and Fedor Lopukhov to music by Mikhail Kroshner. The libretto by Yermolayev and Yuri Slonimsky is based on a story by Źmitrok Biadula. Nightingale is the first Belarusian ballet to be staged at the National Opera and Ballet of Belarus, on 5 November 1939.

References
Notes

Sources
 Craine, Debra and Mackrell, Judith (2010). The Oxford Dictionary of Dance. Oxford University Press. 
 Lopukhov, Fedor (2003). Writings on Ballet and Music. University of Wisconsin Press. 

Ballet in Belarus
1939 ballet premieres
Soviet ballets